Waterloo Brewing LTD., formerly the Brick Brewing Company, is a brewery based in Kitchener, Ontario, Canada, with several divisions. Waterloo is reportedly the largest Canadian-owned brewer in the province, and it was also Ontario's first modern craft brewery.

In December 2022, the company announced that it was being acquired by Carlsberg Group.

Waterloo's most successful brand is the Laker series. Waterloo also operates LandShark Lager Canada and Waterloo Brewing; the latter is their craft brewing division. In mid-2019, the company announced that it would change the corporate name from Brick to Waterloo Brewing Ltd.

Overview
The company's administration currently consists of president and CEO George Croft and COO Russell Tabata. Founder Jim Brickman resigned in 2008.

In the early 1990s, Waterloo briefly produced Pride Lager, Canada's first beer marketed specifically to gay consumers. Pride Lager was not a new product, however, but simply one of the company's existing brews bottled and sold under an alternate label.

In January 2017, Waterloo put its Formosa Springs Brewery in Formosa, Ontario, up for sale; that resulted in the re-opening of the 40,000 square foot plant after the new owner was interested in retaining the facility. In addition to the Formosa brand, Waterloo also sold the Red Baron lines.

Wateloo planned to consolidate its operations in Kitchener and expand the plant, at an estimated cost of $4 million.

In late 2018, the company announced a plan to invest $9.6 million in a tasting room, small-batch brewhouse, expanded warehouse and production facility and an expanded retail store at its Bingemans Centre Drive operation. 
This is said to bring its investment to nearly $30 million CAD in five years.

After all of the projects are completed, the company's investment over the previous six years will have totaled about $45 million.

Waterloo Brewing brands

Waterloo Craft Lager
Waterloo Amber
Waterloo Dark
Waterloo IPA
Waterloo Grapefruit Radler
Waterloo Raspberry Radler
Seasonal/limited beers: Waterloo Double Double Doppelbock; Waterloo Salted Caramel Porter; Waterloo Pineapple Radler; Waterloo Citrus Radler; Waterloo Vanilla Porter

Laker family of brands
Laker Lager
Laker Light
Laker Ice
Laker Red
Laker Strong

Other products
Landshark Lager
Seagram Craft Cider
Seagram Wildberry Vodka Cooler
Seagram Island Time Anytime
Seagram Island Time Tiki Mule
Red Cap Ale

See also
 Beer in Canada

References

External links
 Laker Beer
 Seagram Coolers
 Waterloo Brewing

Beer brewing companies based in Ontario
Canadian beer brands
Companies based in Kitchener, Ontario
Food and drink companies established in 1984
1984 establishments in Ontario
Companies listed on the Toronto Stock Exchange